Ann or Anne Moore may refer to:

 Ann Moore (equestrian) (born 1950), 1972 Olympic silver medalist in show jumping
 Ann Moore (impostor) (1761–1813), notorious as the fasting-woman of Tutbury
 Ann Moore (inventor) (born 1934), inventor of the Snugli
 Ann S. Moore (born 1950), CEO of Time Inc.
 Anne Elizabeth Moore, editor, artist, and author
 Anne Carroll Moore (1871–1961), American librarian

See also
 Annie Moore (disambiguation)